MTV Igman is a Bosnian local commercial television channel based in Pazarić near Sarajevo.

TV station was established in 1993 under the name "Muslimanska televizija IGMAN". According to the recommendations and guidelines of the Communications Regulatory Agency of Bosnia and Herzegovina, the official name has been changed to MTV Igman. Religious and educational program is mainly produced in Bosnian language (from 10:00h–24:00h). Local radio station Radio Hayat is also part of this company.

External links

 Communications Regulatory Agency of Bosnia and Herzegovina

Mass media in Sarajevo
Television stations in Bosnia and Herzegovina
Television channels and stations established in 1993